The XI International Brigade fought for the Spanish Second Republic in the Spanish Civil War.

It would become especially renowned for providing desperately needed support in the darkest hours of the Republican defense of Madrid on 8 November 1936, when, with great losses, it helped repulse a major assault by veteran Nationalist troops, buying time for more Republican troops to be brought into the city.

Order of battle

It was originally mustered from international volunteers at Albacete, Spain, in mid-October 1936 as the IX Brigada Movíl, with four battalions:
Franco-Belgian Battalion (14 Oct 1936)
Austro-German Battalion (14 Oct 1936)
Italo-Spanish Battalion (14 Oct 1936)
Polish-Balkan Battalion (17 Oct 1936)

It was redesignated the 'XI "Hans Beimler"  International Brigade' on 22 October 1936, with General "Kléber" (Manfred Stern) commanding. The original battalions were renamed as follows:
The Franco-Belgian battalion, led by Jules Dumont, became the Commune de Paris Battalion
The Austro-German battalion, led by Hans Kahle, became the Edgar André Battalion, (after Edgar André).
The Italo-Spanish battalion became the Garibaldi Battalion, (after Giuseppe Garibaldi).
The Polish-Balkan battalion, led by Boleslav Ulanovski, became the Dabrowski Battalion (pronounced "Dombrowski"), (after Jarosław Dąbrowski).

Shortly after the formation of XII International Brigade in November, 1936, its Thälmann Battalion and the Garibaldi Battalion (which had no rifles) swapped places.

Other units that formed part of XI International Brigade at other times were:
Asturias-Heredia Battalion
Hans Beimler Battalion
Madrid Battalion
Pacifico Battalion
Pasionaria Battalion
Zwölfter Februar Battalion

The brigade fought in the battles of Madrid, the Corunna Road, Jarama, Guadalajara, Brunete, Belchite, Teruel, and the Ebro.
After the death of Hans Beimler the energetic Giuseppe Di Vittorio became the political commissar.

Commemoration

On 18 July 1956, the German Democratic Republic issued the Hans Beimler Medal to veterans of the XI International Brigade, and other volunteer units in Spain. At the time, there were 632 surviving veterans alive. On the 20th anniversary of the end of the war, in September 1959, a further 112 were awarded. The medal is silver with a relief portrait of Hans Beimler on one side, and the three-pointed star of the International Brigades on the reverse, with the inscription "KAMPFER FVR SPANIENS FREIHEIT 1936-1939", Fighters for Spanish Liberty (1936–1939).

See also
International Brigades
International Brigades order of battle

References

Military units and formations established in 1936
International Brigades
Mixed Brigades (Spain)
Military units and formations disestablished in 1939